A shipping agency or shipping agent is the designated person or agency held responsible for handling shipments and cargo, and the general interests of its customers, at ports and harbors worldwide, on behalf of ship owners, managers, and charterers. In some parts of the world, these agents are referred to as port agents or cargo brokers. There are several categories of shipping agents such as: port agents, liner agents, and own agencies, each rendering specific services depending on the shipping company they represent.

In other words, a ship agent is any person or company that carries out the functions of an agent. They can be in business as a ship agent, or they perform such functions as an adjunct to, or conjunction with, other activities such as ship owning or operating, providing cargo handling or similar.

Shipping agents will usually take care of all the regular routine tasks of a shipping company quickly and efficiently. They ensure that essential supplies, crew transfers, customs documentation, and waste declarations are all arranged with the port authorities without delay. Quite often, they also provide the shipping company with updates and reports on activities at the destination port so that shipping companies have real-time information available to them while goods are in transit.

Tasks and responsibilities 
Succinctly, the term shipping agent refers to the relationship between the principal (in this case the shipping company conveying the goods) and its representative. The principal, expressly or impliedly, authorizes the agent to work under his control and on his behalf.

The responsibilities/competencies as well as the remuneration of the agent may be explicitly entered into a contract which has been concluded between himself and the ship owner. This practice is very common in the cargo trade, booking agents, etc.
 
The duties of a cargo broker are similar to those of a shipping agent, but may also vary. For example, a cargo broker will also book outward cargo and inform the shippers on which quay and when the goods are to be presented and when loading and unloading is due to start. He will draw up booking lists according to the incoming bookings and ensure that the manifest department collects the shipping documents (shipping permits, bills of lading) which are necessary to commence the loading and unloading operations. The collected documents are also compared with the booking lists.

Responsibilities of Shipping Agents Include: 
 Ensuring a berth for the incoming ship
 Arranging for the pilot and the tugs if necessary
 Drawing up the documents for the customs and harbor services
 Arranging for the necessary ship fresh water / provisions
 Arranging for a doctor in case the crew needs medical assistance
 Arranging for storage bunkers if these are needed
 Arranging for necessary repairs 
 Conveying instructions to and from the ship owner
 Organizing the supply, transport and the handling of the goods
 Organizing the necessary contacts with the stevedores
 Collecting freights, cargoes
 Contacting shippers and the receivers of the goods

In the case of damage to cargo or the ship, the shipping agent also makes the necessary arrangements (at the request of the ship's master or owner) with the insurance company, and for nautical inspections and the services of experts or surveyors, etc.

The specific tasks of a cargo broker or port agent include:
 Providing the necessary information concerning the freight rates and the publication of the sailing lists
 Looking for cargo via notices and sailing lists
 Booking of cargo and the conclusion of the agreements
 Drawing up, initiating and delivering the required documents (booking lists, shipping permits, delivery orders) related to the cargo
 Contacting the shippers/forwarders with regard to the deliveries for shipment
 Fulfilling the necessary formalities regarding the delivery and reception of the goods (customs etc.)
 Settling cargo claims with insurance companies

Fees 
Shipping agents or port agents receive a fee called an agency fee for their services.

See also 
 Shipping portal

References

Shipping